(former name; Takashi Tokuhiro, 徳弘 隆) is a former Japanese football player. He played for Japan national team.

Club career
Mizuno was born on April 28, 1931. After graduating from Kwansei Gakuin University, he joined Yuasa Batteries in 1954. He also played for Kwangaku Club was consisted of his alma mater Kwansei Gakuin University players and graduates. he won 1953, 1955 and 1958 Emperor's Cup

National team career
On October 9, 1955, Mizuno debuted for Japan national team against Burma.

National team statistics

References

External links
 
 Japan National Football Team Database

1931 births
Living people
Kwansei Gakuin University alumni
Japanese footballers
Japan international footballers
Association football forwards